Aiken Glacier is a small glacier between Von Guerard Glacier and Wales Glacier on the north slope of Kukri Hills, Victoria Land. It was named by the Advisory Committee on Antarctic Names (1997) from association with Aiken Creek, named for USGS Hydrologist Dr. George R. Aiken, which flows north from this glacier into Taylor Valley.

See also
 List of glaciers in the Antarctic

Glaciers of Scott Coast